Alifedrine is a partial beta-adrenergic agonist.

References

Beta-adrenergic agonists
Endocrine system
Phenylethanolamines
Substituted amphetamines